Granulenotes granulipennis is a species of beetle in the family Cerambycidae, and the only species in the genus Granulenotes. It was described by Breuning in 1969.

References

Enicodini
Beetles described in 1969